The year 1906 was marked, in science fiction, by the following events.

Births and deaths

Births 
 birthday unknown : Mark Clifton, American writer (died 1963)
 October 29 : Fredric Brown, American writer (died 1972)

Deaths

Events

Awards 
The main science-fiction Awards known at the present time did not exist at this time.

Literary releases

Novels 
 In the Days of the Comet, novel by H. G. Wells.

Stories collections

Short stories

Comics

Audiovisual outputs

Movies 
 The '?' Motorist by Walter R. Booth.
  Travel around a Star by Gaston Velle.

See also 
 1906 in science
 1905 in science fiction
 1907 in science fiction

References

science-fiction
Science fiction by year